= Kimberley House =

Building in Johannesburg, South Africa

Coordinates: 26.20432°S 28.04227°E

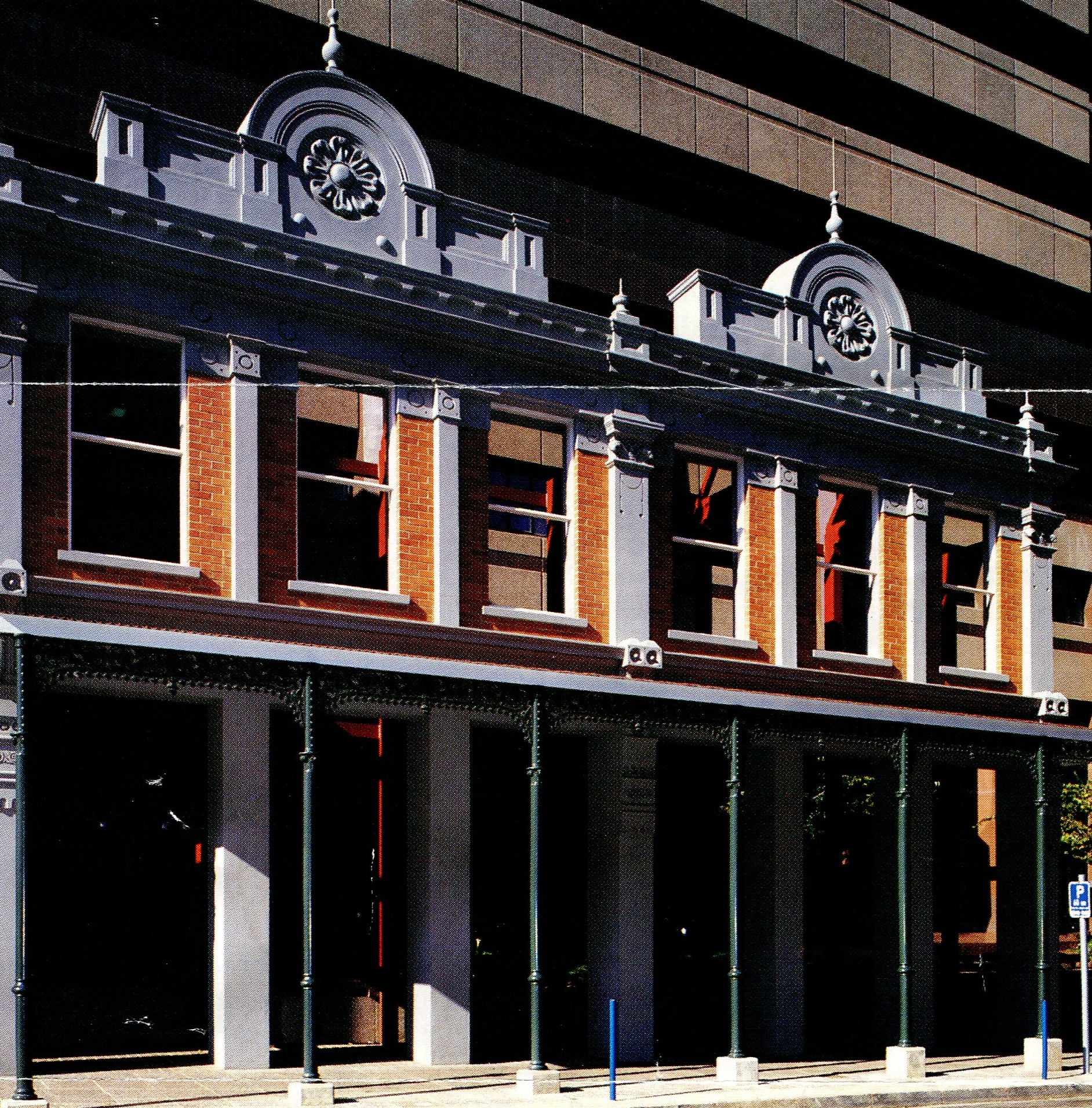
- Kimberley house in Pritchard Str Johannesburg
- Interactive map of the Kimberley House area

General information
- Status: facade
- Location: Johannesburg, South Africa
- Completed: 4 January 1892

Height
- Roof: 9 metres (30 ft)

Design and construction
- Architect: Chris J Olley

The Kimberley house at 44 Pritchard street is Victorian style and one of the oldest buildings in the city of Johannesburg. The building was constructed in 1892 by the architect Chris J Olley and the owners of the building ran a shop for various kinds of fashion wares. With limited resources at their disposal, the builders used oxen to fetch material ordered from England to Johannesburg.

== Design ==
The building is a Victorian style however different styles were also incorporated into the design with plaster roundels copied from style books and verandas decorated from standard iron cast items selected from catalogues and ordered from England and Scotland. Oxen had to be used to fetch the material from Durban since there was no train rail to Johannesburg at the time.

== Demolition ==
The building was demolished to give way to the development of the Old Mutual building however the facade of the building was restored by the Old Mutual properties and was incorporated as part of the modern building.
